Charles Mark Gurassa (born February 1956) is a British businessman and chair of the Guardian Media Group. He is a former chairman of the television station, Channel 4, and succeeded Lord Burns in January 2016.

Gurassa was CEO of Thomson Travel Group PLC from December 1999 to May 2003. He served as a non-executive director of Merlin Entertainment until November 2019 when he stepped down as part of an acquisition. He was an independent non-executive director of easyJet from 2011-2020.

In July 2020, Oxfam announced that they had elected him to succeed Caroline Thomson as its chair in October 2020.

References

1956 births
British chief executives
British corporate directors
Living people
Chairmen of Channel 4